Herga is a small village in the Udupi district of Karnataka, India.

Geography
The village has mainly paddy fields. It is approximately 3 kilometres from Parkala and 8 kilometers from Manipal.

Herga Temple 

Herga has a Durgaparameshwari Temple on a small hilltop. During February of each year, procession (jaatre or uthsava) of the deity is carried out and is celebrated as a grand event. The temple was renovated in 1983. A Dhwajasthamba (flag-post) made of stone was constructed in 1993. The presiding Goddess of the temple is also known as Hergamma (protector of Herga) or Gramadevate (Grama - village, Devate - Goddess).

Climate 
The climate is humid and warm between November and May and wet and cool during the monsoon months from June to October. It has a tropical climate characteristic of coastal plains in the West of India.

Villages in Udupi district